Stephen or Steven Myers may refer to:
 Stephen Myers (engineer)
 Stephen Myers (abolitionist)
 Steven Myers (CEO)
 Steven Myers (politician)
 Steve Myers, American soccer goalkeeper